Para Brahman in Hindu philosophy is the "Supreme Brahman" that which is beyond all descriptions and conceptualisations. It is described as the formless (in the sense that it is devoid of Maya) that eternally pervades everything, everywhere in the universe and whatever is beyond.

Para Brahman is conceptualised in diverse ways. In the Advaita Vedanta tradition, the Para Brahman is a synonym of nirguna brahman, i.e., the attribute-less Absolute. Conversely, in Dvaita Vedanta and Vishistadvaita Vedanta traditions, the Para Brahman is defined as saguna brahman, i.e., the Absolute with attributes. In Vaishnavism, Shaivism, and Shaktism, Vishnu, Shiva, and Adi Shakti respectively are Para Brahman. Mahaganapati is considered as Para Brahman by the Ganapatya sect. Kartikeya is considered as Para Brahman by the Kaumaram sect.

Etymology
Para is a Sanskrit word that means "higher" in some contexts, and "highest or supreme" in others.

Brahman in Hinduism connotes the Absolute, the Ultimate Reality in the universe. In major schools of Hindu philosophy it is the immaterial, efficient, formal and final cause of all that exists. Brahman is a key concept found in the Vedas and is extensively discussed in the early Upanishads and in Advaita Vedanta literature.

Advaita Vedanta
In Advaita Vedanta, the Para Brahman is defined as nirguna brahman, or Brahman without form or qualities. It is a state of complete knowledge of self as being identical with the transcendental Brahman, a state of mental-spiritual enlightenment (Jnana yoga). It contrasts with Saguna Brahman which is a state of loving awareness (Bhakti yoga). Advaita Vedanta non-dualistically holds that Brahman is divine, the Divine is Brahman, and this is identical to that which is Atman (one's soul, innermost self) and nirguna (attribute-less), infinite, love, truth, knowledge, "being-consciousness-bliss".

According to Eliot Deutsch, Nirguna Brahman is a "state of being" in which all dualistic distinctions between one's own soul and Brahman are obliterated and are overcome. In contrast, Saguna Brahman is where the distinctions are harmonized after duality between one's own soul and Brahman has been accepted.

Advaita describes the features of a nondualistic experience, in which a subjective experience also becomes an "object" of knowledge and a phenomenal reality. The Absolute Truth is both subject and object, so there is no qualitative difference:
 "Learned transcendentalists who know the Absolute Truth call this nondual substance Brahman, Paramātmā or Bhagavān." (Bhagavata Purana 1.2.11)
 "Whoever realizes the Supreme Brahma attains to supreme felicity. That Supreme Brahma is Eternal Truth (satyam), Omniscient (jnanam), Infinite (anantam)." (Taittiriya Upanishad 2.1.1)

The Upanishads state that the Supreme Brahma is Eternal, Conscious, and Blissful sat-chit-ânanda. The realisation of this truth is the same as being this truth:
 "The One is Bliss. Whoever perceives the Blissful One, the reservoir of pleasure, becomes blissful forever." (Taittiriya Upanishad 2.7.1-2)
 "Verily know the Supreme One to be Bliss." (Brihadaranyaka Upanishad 2.9.28)

Vaishnavism 
In Vaishnavism, Vishnu (Narayana) is considered as Para Brahman ( Adinarayana). Vishnu in his Vishvarupa is considered to be the supreme. His abode is called Vaikuntha and the name there is Para Vasudeva . He is depicted as the only Adipurusha According to the Narayana sukta in the Yajurveda . Narayana, in Hinduism, is considered as the Supreme Truth (Brahman), the thousand-headed, thousand-eyed, and thousand-limbed creator and this hymn is sung to worship Narayana, the universal Self (Paramatman).

Shaivism
In Shaivism, Shiva is Para Brahman. Parashiva, the supreme form of Lord Shiva, is considered as Para Brahman. According to Shiva Purana , Parashiva is the single incarnation of all souls and deities. He is also depicted as the only Adipurusha or Mahadeva.

Kashmir Shaivism

In Kashmir Shaivism, Svachhanda Bhairava is considered as the supreme form of Shiva. Kashmir Shaivism consider Svachhanda Bhairava as Para Brahman. Kashmir Shaivism holds turiya, or the fourth state of consciousness, as the state of Brahman. It is neither wakefulness, dreaming, nor deep sleep. It exists in the junction between any of these three states, i.e. between waking and dreaming, between dreaming and deep sleep, and between deep sleep and waking. In Kashmir Shaivism there exists a fifth state of consciousness called Turiyatita - the state beyond Turiya which represents Parabrahman. Turiyatita, also called the void or shunya is the state where one attains liberation otherwise known as jivanmukti or moksha.

Shaktism
In Shaktism, Adi Parashakti is considered to be the Para Brahman both with and without qualities, and also Brahman in its energetic state, the ultimate reality. According to Devi Suktam and Sri Suktam in Rigveda she is the womb of all creation. Thus Mahakali is epithets is Brahmamayi, meaning "She Whose Essence is Brahman". Tridevi is the supreme form of Adi Parashakti. Her eternal abode is called Manidvipa.

Sant Mat 
In Sant Mat and Kabir panth, Akshar Purush is called Parabrahman.
Parabrahman is other than Brahman so in the language of saints, it is called Parabrahman (Para = next). He is perishable. Akshar Purush (Parabrahman) was originated by Achint (a son of Satpurush). Achint was assigned some work. For the help in his work, he created Akshar Purush (Parabrahman), but Akshar Purush had done some negligence in his work due to which he was expelled from Satlok along with the seven sankh Brahmands.

See also

 Nondualism
 Achintya Bheda Abheda
 Adi Parashakti
 Ātman (Hinduism)
 Bhakti
 Brahma
 Jiva
 Jnana
 Parbrahm Ashram
 Mahaganapati
 Oachira Temple
 Mahavishnu
 Narayana
 Om
 Padanilam Parabrahma Temple
 Paramatma
 Parashiva
 Svayam Bhagavan
 Vedanta
 Yoga

Notes

References

Sources

External links

Hindu philosophical concepts
Hindu gods